Damian Lane (born 1994) is an Australian jockey based in Victoria. 

Lane was born in Bunbury in Western Australia. He began his career in Western Australia in 2009, and later moved to Victoria. His first Group One winner was Trust In A Gust in the 2014 Sir Rupert Clarke Stakes at Caulfield. As of early January 2022, he has ridden 1,229 winners, including 21 in Group One races.

He spent three months in Japan from April to July 2019, riding 37 winners, and another three months there between April and July 2020, riding 41 winners. In 2019 in the Melbourne spring racing carnival he rode the Japanese-trained horses Mer De Glace and Lys Gracieux in their respective Caulfield Cup and W. S. Cox Plate wins.

References

1994 births
Living people
Australian jockeys
People from Bunbury, Western Australia